Portsoy is a town in Aberdeenshire, Scotland. Historically, Portsoy was in Banffshire. The original name may come from Port Saoithe, meaning "saithe harbour". It had a population of 1,752 at the time of the 2011 census.

History

Portsoy became a burgh of barony in 1550, under Sir Walter Ogilvie of Boyne Castle, and the charter was confirmed by parliament in 1581.

From the 16th century until 1975, Portsoy was in the civil and religious parish of Fordyce. It lost its status as a burgh in 1975 and became a part of the District of Banff And Buchan. In 1996, administration was transferred to the Aberdeenshire council area.

The "old harbour" dates to the 17th century and is the oldest on the Moray Firth. The "new harbour" was built in 1825 for the growing herring fishery, which at its peak reached 57 boats. The Old Town Hall in The Square was completed in 1798.

Economy
Portsoy is known for local jewellery made from "Portsoy marble" (which is not marble, but rather serpentinite). The annual Scottish Traditional Boat Festival was started in 1993 to celebrate the 300th year of the harbour.

In popular culture
Portsoy, notably the harbour, has featured in BBC period dramas The Camerons, The Shutter Falls and Peaky Blinders"Peaky Blinders filming locations: where is it set as Cillian Murphy and cast seen in Portsoy shooting season 6" – The Scotsman, 9 February 2021 and a Tennent's Lager advert parodying the 1949 film Whisky Galore!.  It was also the principal location for Gillies MacKinnon's film Whisky Galore!, a 2016 remake of the 1949 film; Portsoy represented the fictional island of Todday.

Transport
Portsoy railway station was formerly the terminus of the Banff, Portsoy and Strathisla Railway branch of the Great North of Scotland Railway system.

Notable people
 Jimmy MacBeath, the wandering singer, was born in Portsoy and is buried there
 William Boyd, Canadian pathologist and medical textbook writer, was born in Portsoy
 Eoin Jess, the former Aberdeen and Scotland footballer, was born in Portsoy
 Jim Paterson, trombonist with Dexys Midnight Runners, was born and raised in Portsoy

References

Further reading
Descriptive Gazetteer Entry for Portsoy (F.H. Groome, Ordnance Gazetteer of Scotland (1882-4)

External links 

Portsoy's page in the Gazetteer of Scotland
 Panorama of Portsoy Harbour (QuickTime required)

Portsoy
Burghs
Towns in Aberdeenshire